Ente Veedu Appuvinteyum is a 2003 Indian Malayalam-language family drama film directed by Sibi Malayil and produced by Prem Prakash. It was the debut movie as scriptwriters of brothers Bobby and Sanjay. The film starred Kalidas Jayaram, Jayaram and Jyothirmayi in lead roles along Kalashala Babu, Nedumudi Venu,
Siddique,
Salim Kumar,
Vishnu Unnikrishnan,
Shammi Thilakan,
Sanusha and 
K. P. A. C. Lalitha in supporting roles. It was remade in Tamil as Kannadi Pookal. Kalidas won the National Film Award for Best Child Artist for his performance in the film.

Plot
The movie revolves around Viswanathan, his wife Meera and his son Vasudev who are a very happy family. Although Meera is Vasu's stepmother, they are very close to each other. Meera loves Vasu as her own son and Vasu considers Meera as not only his mother but also as his best friend.

In the meantime, Meera gives birth to a son and it is Vasu who is the happiest. He names his little brother Appu and cares much for him. After Appu is born, his parents start paying more attention to the baby while Vasu feels left out. On Appu's birthday, Vasu buys him a small gift with the pennies he had saved. But when he sees everyone is giving expensive and much costlier gifts, he feels disappointed and hides his gift. He feels insecure when he sees his parents caring for Appu more while they are not being attentive towards him. Feeling dejected, one day Vasu and his father fall into an argument and Vishwanathan goes to the extent of slapping Vasudev. This begins to create problems leading Vasu to unintentionally kill the baby, which in-turn gets him imprisoned in the juvenile home. After completing the terms in the juvenile home, he comes back to the home and gets a surprise from Meera in the form of another baby as his step-brother. He names the baby Appu and gifts him the old gift he bought for the deceased baby with Viswanathan and Meera happy about their bonding.

Cast

Reception

Box office 
The film was a commercial success.

Accolades 

National Film Awards 2003
 Best Child Artiste – Kalidas Jayaram

Kerala State Film Awards 2003 
Kerala State Film Award for Best Film with Popular Appeal and Aesthetic Value - Prem Prakash ( film producer )
Kerala State Film Award for Best Director - Sibi Malayil

Asianet Film Awards

 Asianet Film Award for Best Film - Prem Prakash ( film producer )

References

External links

Ente Veedu Appuvinteyum at Oneindia.in

2003 films
2000s Malayalam-language films
Malayalam films remade in other languages
Films with screenplays by Bobby-Sanjay
Films directed by Sibi Malayil
Films scored by Ouseppachan